The Storm Prediction Center issues daily outlooks denoting the risk for severe weather and wildfires for specific regions in the United States. For severe weather, which includes the risk for thunderstorms, tornadoes, hail, and straight-line winds, there are five risk levels indicating the probability for these hazards: marginal, slight, enhanced, moderate, and high. For wildfires, there are three risk levels: elevated, critical, and extremely critical.

Although outlooks issued by the Storm Prediction Center indicate the severity of a convective or wildfire threat, they do not always come to fruition. There have been many instances where a high risk outlook did not verify and only a few tornadoes occurred. Conversely, there have been days where a lower risk level was issued and a major tornado outbreak occurred. Some of the deadliest severe weather and wildfire days in recent history did not have a high risk or extremely critical outlook issued. For example, the 2011 Joplin tornado, which killed 158 people occurred on a moderate risk day, as did the tornado outbreak of December 10–11, 2021, which killed 89 people. Furthermore, the October 2017 Northern California wildfires, which killed 44 people occurred under a critical fire weather outlook.

The following are lists of the deadliest days in which various risk levels were issued for severe weather and wildfires.

Deadliest severe weather outlooks
Note: Only direct tornadic fatalities are included, unless otherwise noted.

Slight risk days

Enhanced risk days
Note: Enhanced risks have only been issued since October 22, 2014.

Moderate risk days

High risk days

Deadliest fire weather outlooks

Critical days

Extremely critical days

See also
List of United States tornado emergencies

Notes

References

Storm Prediction Center days by death toll
Lists of tornadoes in the United States
National Weather Service
Tornado-related lists
United States environment-related lists
Weather-related lists
Weather warnings and advisories
Wildfires in the United States